Nicols is a surname. Notable people with the surname include:

Henry Nicols (1973–2000), American HIV/AIDS activist
Maggie Nicols (born 1948), Scottish vocalist and dancer
Rosemary Nicols (born 1941), English actress

See also
Nicol
Nicolls
Nichols (surname)
Nicholls (name)

Patronymic surnames
Surnames from given names